Nomane is a Trans–New Guinea language of Nomane Rural LLG, Chimbu Province, Papua New Guinea.

References

Languages of Simbu Province
Languages of Eastern Highlands Province
Chimbu–Wahgi languages